Sébastien Aubert is a French entrepreneur and film producer born in 1983. He is the co-founder of the production company ADASTRA Films.

In 2012 he wins one of the four European Awards for Entrepreneurship by the Erasmus for Young Entrepreneurs programme of the European Union in Brussels.
His first feature film Brides (2014 film) receives the Third Audience Award at the 64th Berlin International Film Festival - Panorama Section. In 2014 he is awarded Best Emerging Producer by France Télévisions. In May 2015, he is on the list of "the future leaders in film production" published during the Cannes Film Festival by Screen International.
The same year, the French business magazine Journal des Entreprises includes him among the "100 businessmen who will change France".

References

External links
 Sébastien Aubert at the Internet Movie Database
 Sébastien Aubert at Unifrance
 Sébastien Aubert at the Berlinale Talent Campus

1983 births
Living people
Emlyon Business School alumni